Ibiza Gran Hotel is a luxury five-star hotel in Talamanca, Ibiza. Situated in Ibiza Town, it overlooks the harbour and is surrounded by gardens. The hotel has a five-star restaurant which serves Mediterranean and international cuisine and contains the Casino of Ibiza, a gambling venue. The hotel also has a spa and wellness center, with steam baths, jacuzzi, climatized pool, sauna, and Hammam and suites for private treatments. The hotel regularly hosts conferences and events and has 7 meeting rooms and exposition salons. The Belfast Telegraph notes the grandeur of the lobby, saying that "you could be forgiven for thinking you have stumbled into a modern art museum."

References

External links
Official site

Hotels in Ibiza
Hotels in Spain
Hotels established in 2008
Hotel buildings completed in 2008